Powderpuff lily may refer to:

 Scadoxus multiflorus, native to sub-Suharan Africa
 Scadoxus pole-evansii, endemic to eastern Zimbabwe

See also
 Powderpuff lillypilly